Darkhawk (Christopher Powell) is a fictional superhero appearing in American comic books published by Marvel Comics. The character first appeared in Darkhawk #1 (March 1991), and was created by writer Tom DeFalco and artist Mike Manley. The character appeared in a series of self-titled comics from 1991-1995, then recurred in several limited-run series and multi-title events in the years since. The character's origin is based on a link between a human character and an android from another dimension known as Null Space. The character has also appeared in non-speaking roles on television and video games.

Publication history
Darkhawk appeared in a self-titled monthly series for 50 issues that was published by Marvel Comics from March 1991 to March 1995, and included three standalone annuals. Although created by DeFalco and Manley, DeFalco was never credited as a writer of the series. The original writer was Danny Fingeroth.

After his own series ended, Darkhawk co-starred or cameoed in other titles over the following years, such as New Warriors, Avengers/JLA, and Iron Man, eventually resurfacing in Runaways (vol. 2) #1–6, followed by Marvel Team Up (vol. 3) #15 and the short-lived Loners series. The New Warriors writer Fabian Nicieza said in 1992 that "People keep coming up to me and asking, 'Is Darkhawk a member of the New Warriors or not?' Well, yes and no. The New Warriors isn't an official group with a rule book and charter and the like. They're more of a club for super-powered teens. So if Darkhawk wants to hang out on a Friday evening and talk about his powers, then he'll stop by the New Warriors' crash pad."

Darkhawk appeared within the Secret Invasion tie-in issues of Nova (vol. 4) (#17–18) and was the focus of the two-issue mini-series War of Kings: Darkhawk, written by C. B. Cebulski, Dan Abnett and Andy Lanning. War of Kings: Darkhawk brought closure to Chris Powell's earthbound human relationships with his family and fellow Loners team members, and serves to establish a clean slate for the sequel series, War of Kings: Ascension, written by Dan Abnett and Andy Lanning.

Darkhawk appeared in Avengers Arena, a 2012–13 series by Dennis Hopeless and Kev Walker.

Fictional character biography
Christopher Powell was born in Queens, New York. While witnessing his policeman father accept a bribe from a crime boss at an abandoned amusement park, teenager Chris Powell discovered a mysterious amulet. This amulet allowed him to switch places with a powerful android that his mind controlled. Powell vowed to use the amulet as "an edge against crime." In this role, he worked with other superheroes and battled a number of costumed villains.

Darkhawk soon encountered his first supervillain, the Hobgoblin, and battled him alongside Spider-Man. He next fought Savage Steel, and then Portal. He next battled the U-Foes alongside Captain America. He battled the villain Lodestone, who attempted to remove his amulet. He battled Savage Steel again, this time alongside the Punisher. Darkhawk battled the cyborg Midnight, Thunderball, and the Secret Empire alongside Spider-Man, the Punisher, Night Thrasher, Nova, and Moon Knight. Darkhawk then battled assassins from the Foreigner's 1400 Club. He battled Tombstone, who successfully removed his amulet from his chest.

Darkhawk occasionally worked with the New Warriors and was a provisional member of the West Coast Avengers. Darkhawk also battled a number of costumed villains, including the Brotherhood of Mutants.

 Powell discovered that the android was stored and repaired aboard a starship in a dimension called Null Space. When he used the amulet to access the android body, his human body switched places with it. Five Darkhawk amulets were commissioned by an alien crime lord named Dargin Bokk. The scientists who created the technology eventually used them to assault Bokk. After Bokk destroyed the other scientists two of the scientists beamed their minds to Earth and merged with two Earth scientists there. Byron/Ned Dobbs and Mondu/John Trane created a sixth amulet which is the one that turned Christopher Powell into Darkhawk.

However, the events of War of Kings: Ascension cast doubt on how much of this—even the existence of Bokk himself—was real.

Later, Powell and Darkhawk were split into two separate beings, each with Powell's memories. The Darkhawk body was then transformed into a new shape when it accidentally downloaded data from the ship, later re-emerging so that Powell could change back and forth between the two without teleporting to Null Space.

Excelsior (the Loners)
Powell later joined a group of former teenage superheroes who were struggling with their current lot in life called the Loners (formerly known as Excelsior). Members of this group included Phil Urich (a former Green Goblin), Turbo from the New Warriors, Lightspeed from Power Pack, and Ricochet from the Slingers. The group was hired by a mysterious benefactor – later revealed to be former Avengers sidekick and Captain Marvel and Hulk partner Rick Jones – to track down the Runaways in Los Angeles.

Powell displayed trouble controlling his anger in his Darkhawk persona, leading to a short skirmish with Turbo. Dismayed with himself, Powell admits to his teammates that he suffered a nervous breakdown. Powell decided to never turn into Darkhawk again, but this decision did not last long, as shortly thereafter the group battled the notorious Avengers villain, Ultron. Darkhawk delivered the final blow, using a darkforce blast at point blank range to blow Ultron to pieces. Following the battle and the revelation of Jones' involvement, Excelsior opted to remain together and act as a more traditional superhero team.

Excelsior eventually change their minds about being superheroes and instead become a 'superhero support group' due to the events of the superhuman Civil War rendering moot their original purpose to dissuade and/or help young superheroes cope with their powers/superhuman identities, as this role was now being officially fulfilled by the U.S. government (though Excelsior's new group mission was also fulfilled by the U.S. government). However, a new addition to the group, Mattie Franklin convinces Powell to use his powers in order to help her take down the MGH dealers that moved to Los Angeles. Powell inconsistently displays his rage issues during this time, mostly acting as a peacemaker between Mattie and Ricochet after the three team up to battle crime.

Secret Invasion
Deciding to register with the government, Darkhawk is assigned to the position of Security Chief at Project P.E.G.A.S.U.S. During the Skrull invasion, he teams up with his old team-mate Nova for two issues of that character's own title, but is also seen in the background of several issues thereafter.

War of Kings
Darkhawk is involved with the War of Kings event in a four-issue series written by Dan Abnett and Andy Lanning called War of Kings: Ascension. With the Loners series ending with low sales and unlikely to be followed with a sequel series, series writer CB Cebulski was assigned to write a two-issue War of Kings: Darkhawk series, with Dan Abnett and Andy Lanning co-scripting the second issue to ensure it tied into their own Ascension series.

A second Darkhawk armor appears near the Powell family home, and the unknown occupant of the armor forces Powell to transform to his own armored form shortly before an explosion rocks the immediate area.

Powell's family survives the blast, but his mother is critically injured. The new Darkhawk introduces himself as Talon and claims to be part of the Fraternity of Raptors, an order created as "the curators of history, and the custodians of the future," of which he and Powell are the last two members. He also explains that Powell's anger issues are a direct result of the amulet not being designed to work with humans. Talon offers to assist Powell with the amulet, and after some deliberation he opts to do so; the two then retreat to the Negative Zone.

The story picks up in War of Kings: Ascension. Powell and Talon are fighting a group of Chitinauts, bug troops that serve Catastrophus, a lieutenant of Annihilus, but Talon's brutal techniques horrify Powell. Later, Powell reveals that he wanted to be just like his friend Nova. Talon explains to him that the Nova Corps are nothing compared to the Fraternity of Raptors, referring to themselves as "architects of fate". Eventually, after being tricked by Talon into fighting just as lethally, Powell manages to connect to the Datasong of the Null Source, which gives him visions of the true past of the Fraternity—a history of kidnappings and assassinations which lead Powell to conclude that the Fraternity are "the bad guys." At this point, Talon attacks him, purging Powell's consciousness from the armor, which manifests a new persona: Razor.

Talon and Razor then recover the Cosmic Control Rod from Catastrophus, Talon stopping briefly to implant a suggestion in the gestating Annihilus, and proceed onward. Powell's personality is revealed not to have been wholly destroyed yet, and a vision of his father tells him that much of what he believed about the armor was false; the prior history, even Evilhawk himself, was a lie made up by his own mind, the other armor a second configuration that took control to cover earlier anger issues. Horrified, Powell's psyche breaks free of the prison it was locked in, only for Powell to find himself on a great tree adorned with thousands of amulets like his own, where he encounters gargoyle-like creatures that urge him to return to the one which he has just emerged from. Meanwhile, in the Negative Zone, Talon and Razor offer Blastaar the Cosmic Control Rod, in exchange for his assistance influencing the outcome of the War of Kings.

Powell encounters a Skrull on the tree mentioned earlier, who has a relationship with Talon much as Razor has with him. However, the Skrull also confides that humanity, as a newer race, cannot be wholly accounted for or controlled by the Raptors, and that Powell's own outbursts of rage have been growing pains in his own control. With this understanding, Powell is able to reassert control over the Darkhawk armor, but not before Razor shoots several Shi'ar and kills Lilandra.

Powell later confronts Talon, and while he is able to force the other Raptor to release the Skrull temporarily, he is quick to begin asserting control again. The Skrull commits suicide to prevent Talon from manifesting, but not before he charges Powell with destroying the rest of the Raptor amulets before they can bring the Fraternity of Raptors back.

Realm of Kings
In Realm of Kings, the Shi'ar Imperium declares Darkhawk the "Galaxy's Most Wanted," making Powell an intergalactic fugitive. His old friend Nova, not willing to believe Powell could be a murderer, tracks him to the planet Shard, which is in danger of falling into a rift in space known as the Fault. Nova offers to help Powell clear his name, but they are interrupted by an attacking biomass from the Fault, and by the awakening of another Raptor, named Gyre. All three are trapped on the planet as it is disintegrated by the Fault.

Darkhawk finds himself saved, alongside Nova, by Nova's old enemy the Sphinx, who seems unaware of Darkhawk's presence. Together, the two heroes join past versions of Reed Richards, Black Bolt, and Namorita in helping the Sphinx combat his younger self. The young Sphinx draws his own warriors, including Gyre, into the battle, and Darkhawk faces and defeats Gyre in single combat, exorcising him from the Kree archaeologist he had possessed. During the fight, Gyre reveals that many more Raptors are re-awakening. Ultimately, the elder Sphinx defeats his counterpart, and mentally controls Darkhawk into giving him his younger self's Ka Stone. Nevertheless, the heroes are able to defeat the double-powered Sphinx and return to their proper places in time (except Namorita, who is pulled into Darkhawk and Nova's time).

Darkhawk returns to Earth and Project: Pegasus to help Nova fight the evil Quasar from the Cancerverse on the other side of the Fault. The evil Quasar damages Darkhawk so badly that his suit shuts down, leaving him alive but unable to accompany Nova as he goes to warn the universe about the threat posed by the Fault. Nova leaves Darkhawk in the care of Project: Pegasus's medical team.

Avengers Arena
Darkhawk appears in Avengers Arena as part of the Marvel NOW! event. He is among the young superheroes that are abducted by Arcade and sent to Murderworld despite not being a teenager himself. Arcade expects his captives to fight to the death. Darkhawk is later attacked by an unidentified cybernetic creature, which tears his transformation amulet from his chest. The amulet is found by Chase Stein, who transforms into the new Darkhawk. The attacker was later revealed to be Death Locket (who was in turn controlled by Apex). When Death Locket stumbled into an underground facility, she comes across a room where Christopher Powell's body is alongside the others who have died in battle. A few days later, when Death Locket and Apex raid the place, it is revealed Darkhawk is alive and Death Locket releases him. He then attacks and knocks out Arcade. Arcade soon talks Apex into letting the war play out, and she controls Death Locket into shooting Darkhawk in the shoulder. Once the series ended, Darkhawk was taken away to parts unknown, injured but reunited with his amulet.

Infinity Countdown
After the events of Avengers Arena as seen during the "Infinity Countdown" storyline, Powell is shown to have joined the New York Police Department and is engaged to a woman named Miranda, with whom he has shared his history as Darkhawk. He experiences frequent visions of the Tree of Shadows in Null Space despite the Darkhawk amulet being damaged and no longer allowing him to change form. One day, he is sent out to the Wonderland Amusement Park, the place where he first became Darkhawk, to investigate a disturbance. There, he is accosted by two dirty cops and almost attacked when he refuses their offer to take bribes. The group is soon attacked by two members of the Shi'ar Fraternity of Raptors, with one able to take Powell's amulet and use it to change into a heavily damaged Razor. The Razor personality asserts control, defeats the other Shi'ar, and teleports Powell to the Datasong in a place it calls "The Perch," where all of the android's memories of its time with Powell are stored. Razor, now calling itself Darkhawk, tells Powell that his compassion and dedication to justice have imprinted upon it, with it wants to rejoin with him in order to stop the Shi'ar Raptors from releasing the true Fraternity of Raptor androids from Null Space. Powell accepts and becomes Darkhawk once more, merging in both body and mind with the Darkhawk android and gaining a new, more powerful form. Seeking a means to get to space, Darkhawk soon encounters Death's Head, who is on Earth to collect a bounty for Darkhawk's armor. After a brief scuffle, Darkhawk realizes that Death's Head would have a spaceship and moves to strike a deal.

Before he goes, Powell says one last goodbye to Miranda, but upon arriving, the Raptors attack Death's Head and swarm Darkhawk to a secret Shi'ar outpost, easily overpowering him in his Darkhawk armor. The Raptors' leader Gyre (who escaped the Null Space along with his fellow Raptors) goes on to reveal to Powell that the amulet is really the key to unleashing the Ratha'kon or Dark Starhawk, which the Shi'ar intended to be a "predator" to the Phoenix Force. However, to bring it to life, two tributes were required, one who's willing and one who's forced. Gyre wanted Powell's amulet because of how special it was, since Powell actually convinced his amulet's persona, Razor, to break free from the Fraternity's stronghold, thus developing sentience. Gyre punches through Powell's chest, leaving him for dead, and then uses his amulet as the forced tribute to fuse with the willing tribute, who turns out to be none other than Robbie Rider, thus allowing Ratha'kon to possess the latter's body. Gyre then takes the Dark Starhawk and the Raptors to Earth — a place where the Phoenix loves to go — for a mysterious mission.

As Powell dragged himself across the ground, he encountered his other half Razor who revealed to him the origins of the Tree of Shadows, a creation of the Gardner and of the first Raptor who was of primitive Shi'ar/Skrull descent. After some coaxing from Razor, Powell tapped into his hidden strength and emerged with a new Darkhawk body after fully fusing his mind with the armor. Powell then flew after the Raptors to stop them.

Powell battled the Raptors with help from Death's Head and Nova Prime. Nova made it difficult to fight Dark Darkhawk as he preferred to reason with his brother Robbie than fight him. Dark Darkhawk then shockingly turned on Gyre and destroyed him while stating that he would bring order to the universe, not Gyre. The Raptors were eventually stopped when Death's Head rigged the power core of the Kree ship the Raptors stole to explode. Only Dark Starhawk survived the explosion, though stunned, allowing Powell to reclaim his Darkhawk Amulet. Dark Starhawk then disappeared in a flash of light after striking his Nega-Bands together. Grieving over the loss of Robbie, Nova angrily told Powell to stay on Earth or he would have him locked up. After Powell returned to Earth, he decided stay out of space for a while. Later that night, he was met by Sleepwalker while he dreamed, telling him that the influence of the Infinity Stones threatened the Mindscape and that the only way he could protect it was to become a Sleepwalker.

Guardians of the Galaxy
Chris would later turn up again at a meeting of great and powerful cosmic players set up by Starfox, brother to the Mad Titan Thanos. While going over the deceased cosmic brigand's last will and testament, this great congruence was attacked by the Cull Obsidian; The Black Order. Contracted by the death goddess Hela, to retrieve what was left of her former consort from their court. All while leaving the galaxian enclave to be sucked into an artificial black hole in order to cover their tracks. Powell would later find himself stranded in the middle of deep space while being brought into the clutches of the Universal Church of Truth. They had him in a mental simulation where he believed himself to have been separated from Razor, run through and across time and space; seeing past, present and future iterations of himself while in the black hole, only to finally find release in the care of a ship piloted by the Kree, Shi'ar and Skrulls. Three races whom are known to be the bitterest enemies in the universe, his final hallucination stems to finding himself a child again while adorning his Raptor body. Something, he confirms to his shock and horror when he takes off his helmet only to see his child-like visage staring back at him in the mirror.

Powers and abilities
Darkhawk's body is a Raptor, a techno-organic construct that possesses enhanced physical abilities, including strength, agility and reflexes, powered by the extraterrestrial amulet embedded in the chest, a seed from the Tree of Shadows in Null Space.

The retractable glider wings under his arms initially only allow him to glide on air currents, but Chris later discovers the ability to outright fly at variable speeds that let him soar from New York to California in a matter of hours. Later still, he has the ability to breach planetary orbit and traverse between planets within seconds. Even major injuries to his Darkhawk body can be repaired by switching back to his human form; his Darkhawk body teleports back to its holding space on the Darkhawk ship within Null Space, where it can be repaired almost instantly. This process does not work for his human body, however. In actuality, the Darkhawk ship does not really exist. Instead, the body currently not inhabited rests at the Tree of Shadows in Null Space. Because of Chris' incompatible human physiology, he is able to transform back and forth at will and assume control over the Raptor body when the Raptor's own consciousness, known as Razor, should have taken control, though the information overload originally affects Chris' mind in ways such as creating a fantasy regarding the body's origins and true nature. After becoming Darkhawk again during the events of Infinity Countdown, Chris and Razor become one. Chris discovers that now, whenever he changes into Darkhawk and vice versa, the amulet actually completely deconstructs and rebuilds his body from stored data. As the Darkhawk body is no longer separate from Chris and does not teleport to Null Space when not in use, it is questionable whether it can be repaired as quickly as it once was.

Darkhawk can project energy from the amulet in his chest as a focal point, either as concussive force blasts, or as a circular energy shield. Chris referred to his force blasts as "darkforce blasts," until he encountered the actual Darkforce Dimension in New Warriors, but still occasionally uses the term. Darkhawk also has telescopic and infra-red vision, and a grappling hook cable/claw weapon on his right arm, which in later forms manifests on both arms.

For a time, Darkhawk was upgraded to a new body design, which gave him greatly enhanced powers. His amulet could project force bubbles in various shapes and he could combine his force fields and force blasts into a giant, hawk-shaped construct around his body. He could fire variable beams of energy from his eyes, be healed by generating an energy pod around his body, and had a single extendable claw on each wrist. He could also mentally communicate with the Darkhawk ship, and could teleport weapons from the ship when he was on Earth. At one point, he was outfitted with additional body armor on top of his android body. At some point after the cancellation of his own series, Darkhawk reverted to his original form under unrevealed circumstances, although he can still summon his second armored form. These abilities, as well as the Darkhawk body's new form, are later revealed to actually be a component of the Raptor's reconfiguration abilities.

His appearance in War of Kings is somewhat more reminiscent of his second costume, and he demonstrates the ability to freely reconfigure the armor into a multitude of forms with abilities that can cope with the current situation. His new forms include Strike Suit mode, featuring heavier armor and weaponry, Warflight mode, which allows for more aerial maneuverability, and Rescue mode, featuring enhanced sensors and the ability to ferry passengers. Since fully merging with Razor, Chris' Darkhawk form is far stronger and more versatile, able to more freely shift and reconfigure his armor, such as demonstrating the ability to assume a giant mecha-like form that is capable of housing passengers.

A Raptor is techno-mystical in nature, being versed in some forms of arcanum and magic. They can also create their own Stargates to shorten universal distances as well as access other dimensions like the Negative Zone.

The Raptor android body's most prolific abilities exist within a hive mind dubbed "The Datasong," a form of radio-telepathic infonet shared between all Raptors which enables vast clairvoyant and techno-psionic abilities, allowing for the absorption, processing, projection, sharing and manipulation of information and memory that is digitized then broadcast directly between their collective cyberminds as well as the mindscape of organic beings. Darkhawk can potentially use this function to control the minds of others as well as divine the myriad of possible future outcomes based upon differing actions. Powell often weaponized this function in order to drive out the normally parasitic android intelligence subverting an amulet hosts mind as the supplicant takes their place within their pod on the Tree of Shadows. A special place within the Datasong acts as a memory storage space called The Perch, a place where both the android A.I. and the mind of an amulet holder pool their shared experiences and mental engrams together like a backup drive. Every bit of data is conjoin coded bit by bit into one another, splicing the foreign personalities together whenever they change from robot body to pilot and back.

Darkhawk's ability to reconfigure is actually revealed to be conscious self-adaptation rather than an inborn mechanical function. The very first Raptor android showed a spontaneous self-adaptive polymorphous ability gleaned from viewing its surroundings. The avian traits and natural ferocity were gained by imprinting on the early ancestors of the Shi'ar species. The shape-shifting capabilities were inherited by observing the primordial Skrull race.

In his human form, Chris Powell has no superhuman abilities, though he has taken some karate and kendo classes.

Enemies

The following are the enemies of Darkhawk:

 Evilhawk - Dargin Bokk is an alien crime lord.
 Hobgoblin - A goblin-themed villain.
 Lodestone - A magnetic-manipulating supervillain.
 Phillipe Bazin - A crime lord who clashed with Darkhawk.
 Portal - A villain who can do dimensional teleportation.
 Savage Steel - A villain in powered battle armor.
 Tombstone - A super-strong albino criminal.
 U-Foes - A group of four supervillains.
 Ironclad - A metal-skinned member of the U-Foes.
 X-Ray - A member of the U-Foes who was permanently transformed into a living energy field.
 Vapor - A member of the U-Foes who can alter her form into any known gas.
 Vector - The telekinetic leader of the U-Foes.

Other versions

House of M
Darkhawk appears as a member of Wolfpack.

U.S. War Machine
In the mini-series U.S. War Machine, set in an alternate universe, Darkhawk was a psychopathic android, which could only be controlled by running a virtual reality program. The program, a "fiction" within that universe, played out the events where Darkhawk had been a member of the West Coast Avengers within normal Marvel continuity. The program itself also appeared in the final pages of US War Machine 2.0 in which Tony Stark's damaged body is placed inside the Darkhawk program in order to keep him alive.

Marvel Zombies
In Marvel Zombies Dead Days, Darkhawk is seen in the S.H.I.E.L.D. Helicarrier as one of the dozens of heroes who survive the initial outbreak zombie plague. They all work to evacuate civilians to another dimension but this plan falls apart.

Marvel Team-Up: League of Losers
Darkhawk features in an arc of Robert Kirkman's Marvel Team-Up (vol. 3), featuring a group of C-list heroes dubbed "The League of Losers". A group of heroes including Darkhawk, Dagger, Araña, Gravity, X-23, Speedball, Sleepwalker and Terror (although Araña dies along the way) go to the future to prevent the villain Chronok from stealing Reed Richards' time machine, Chronok having come to the present and already having killed all of Marvel's major heroes.

It's revealed that Chronok is from the same time period as Kirkman's Mutant 2099; the group stays with him and his mentor Reed Richards to wait for Chronok. The team defeats Chronok, but at the end of the story, Richards reveals they can't go back to their present, due to time-travel and alternate timelines. The group decides to stay in the future, satisfied with the impact they made, however unnoticed. Mutant 2099 suggests reforming the Avengers or the "Fantastic Nine". Effectively trapped in the future, Chris begins a romantic relationship with Dagger. This team makes a cameo in Deadpool/GLI Summer Fun Spectacular (2007) at the end of the issue.

Note that due to the Marvel Universe's method for resolving time travel paradoxes, this story occurred in an alternate universe.

Over the course of this adventure, Chris acts as the core of the "League", serving as their leader and training the mostly novice heroes for their encounter with Chronok. Reed Richards remarks that while he had never thought of Darkhawk as leader material in the past, he is impressed by Chris' efforts.

During the various battles with Chronok and his army, Chris did not appear prone to irrational violence or uncontrollable anger while in his Darkhawk form, as he had during Excelsior's encounter with the Runaways.

Collected editions

In other media

Television
 Darkhawk makes non-speaking cameo appearances in Fantastic Four.
 Robotic versions of Darkhawk appear in Guardians of the Galaxy.

Video games
 Darkhawk appears as a power disc in Disney Infinity 3.0.
 Darkhawk appears as a playable character in Lego Marvel Super Heroes 2.
 Darkhawk appears as a playable character in Marvel: Contest of Champions.
 Darkhawk appears as a playable character in Marvel: Future Fight.

References

External links
 Darkhawk at Marvel.com
 

Avengers (comics) characters
Characters created by Tom DeFalco
Comics characters introduced in 1991
Fictional characters from Queens, New York
Fictional karateka
Marvel Comics characters with accelerated healing
Marvel Comics characters with superhuman strength
Marvel Comics martial artists
Marvel Comics mutates
Marvel Comics titles